Dana Drábová (born June 3, 1961) is a Czech physicist and politician. She is the chair of the State Office for Nuclear Safety and she was President of the 2023 meetings of the parties to the Convention on Nuclear Safety.

Life
Drábová was born in 1961 in Prague. She went to school in Říčany, before studying at the Czech Technical University in Prague. She studied at their Faculty of Nuclear and Physical Engineering, specialising is dosimetry and the application of radiation. She gained the title of "Ing." after she completed her thesis on the Measurement of neutrons and determining the dose from neutrons using microdosimetry.

She is the chairwoman of the State Office for Nuclear Safety.

In 2013 Drábová (aka "The Nuclear Lady") was awarded an honorary degree from the Technical University of Liberec for her work in popularising science. She was appeared on television programmes and she is advocate for technical science to high schools and university students. Drábová has given lectures at the Liberec university.

The entrepreneir Michal Horáček stood to be President of the Czech republic. He announced his advisers in February 2017, including former Slovak presidential candidate Magdaléna Vášáryová, Dana Drábová, and surgeon Pavel Pafko.

In 2018 she was on the board of the think-tank Institute of Modern Politics iSTAR.

In 2023 she announced that the six Czech nuclear power plants would be looking for an alternative supplier for its nuclear fuel.

She was President of the 8th and 9th joint meetings of the parties to the Convention on Nuclear Safety in March 2023.

References

1961 births
Living people
People from Prague
Physicists